Samuel Ochoa Oregel (born September 4, 1986) is a former American professional soccer player.

Professional career
Ochoa began his professional career in the youth ranks of Estudiantes Tecos. He made his debut for Tecos first team during the 2006 season. However, he did not receive significant playing time with the first team.

After spending 5 seasons with Estudiantes Tecos, Ochoa signed with Major League Soccer on August 24, 2011, and was acquired via the MLS allocation process by Seattle Sounders FC on August 26. He  made his MLS debut for the Sounders on September 24, 2011, coming on as a substitute for Nate Jaqua in a 3–1 road win over Vancouver Whitecaps FC. He scored his first goal for Seattle on 10/15/2011 v. San Jose Earthquakes in Kasey Keller's final regular season home match helping his club in a 2–1 victory.

International career
Ochoa was part of the United States U-20 squad in the 2005 FIFA World Youth Championship and played in four matches. He also scored one goal against Turkey in a 3–2 loss.

Career statistics

Personal life
Ochoa holds an American passport, and he is also brother of Jesús Ochoa, another footballer, and is related to Lights FC in stadium DJ, DJ Ocho.

References

External links

1986 births
Living people
Sportspeople from Morelia
Mexican emigrants to the United States
American soccer players
Liga MX players
Major League Soccer players
USL Championship players
Tecos F.C. footballers
Seattle Sounders FC players
Lobos BUAP footballers
Wilmington Hammerheads FC players
FC Tulsa players
Las Vegas Lights FC players
Association football forwards
American sportspeople of Mexican descent
Footballers from Michoacán
Mexican footballers
Soccer players from California
United States men's under-20 international soccer players
United States men's under-23 international soccer players